The Yamaha DT50M is an entry-level  motorcycle in the Yamaha DT50M series, produced from 1978 to 1981. It is a dual-purpose street/trail bike primarily aimed at novice motorcyclists.

The DT50M has twin rear shocks and 19"/17" front and rear wheels. The DT50MX, which is a later model of the DTM50M, has larger 21"/18" wheels and a mono shock rear suspension. After its production and high sales, Yamaha decided to produce a street bike variant of the DT50M, which was given the model number RD50M.

The Yamaha DT50MX was given similar treatment to the Yamaha RD50MX.

Identification (UK)

Note: The Model year is not necessarily the same as the year of sale or first registration.

References

DT50M
Two-stroke motorcycles
Motorcycles introduced in 1978
Dual-sport motorcycles